10th parallel may refer to:

10th parallel north, a circle of latitude in the Northern Hemisphere
10th parallel south, a circle of latitude in the Southern Hemisphere